Chandragiri fort may refer to:
 Chandragiri Fort, Kerala
 Chandragiri Fort, Andhra Pradesh

See also
Chandragiri (disambiguation)